A Woman in Danger (Spanish:Una mujer en peligro) is a 1936 Spanish crime film directed by José Santugini and starring Enrique del Campo, Antoñita Colomé and Alberto Romea.

Cast
   Enrique del Campo as Fernando Herrero  
 Antoñita Colomé as María Isabel  
 Alberto Romea as Dr. Arnal  
 Santiago Ontañón as Ricardo  
 Júlio Castro 'Castrito' as Agapito  
 Pablo Álvarez Rubio as Prof. Layne  
 Mariana Larrabeiti  as Lucrecia  
 José Martín as Jerommo  
 Manuel Vico as Maitre  
 Cándida Folgado as Abuelita  
 Felisa Carreras as Mercedes  
 Cándida Losada as Laura 
 Luisa Sala

References

Bibliography
 Bentley, Bernard. A Companion to Spanish Cinema. Boydell & Brewer, 2008.

External links
 

1936 films
1936 crime films
Spanish crime films
1930s Spanish-language films
Spanish black-and-white films